The National Progressive Party was a liberal political party in Finland from 1918 to 1951. The party was founded 8 December 1918, after the Finnish Civil War, by the  republican majority of the Young Finnish Party and the republican minority of the Finnish Party (the next day the monarchists of both parties founded the National Coalition Party.)

Famous members of the party included Kaarlo Juho Ståhlberg and Risto Ryti, the first and fifth Presidents of Finland, and Sakari Tuomioja.

The National Progressive Party finished its existence in early 1951, as most of its active members had joined the People's Party of Finland. A minority group including Sakari Tuomioja founded the Liberal League.

See also
Liberal Party – Freedom to Choose
Liberalism and centrism in Finland

References

1918 establishments in Finland
1951 disestablishments in Finland
Finland 1918
Defunct political parties in Finland
Liberal parties in Finland
Radical parties
Political parties disestablished in 1951
Political parties established in 1918
Political parties of the Russian Revolution